Brandon Spinelly, popularly known as RJ Brandon, is a Mauritian radio jockey based in Mauritius. He is best known as the host of Radio Plus show MDR .

Radio career

External links

References

Living people
Year of birth missing (living people)
Mauritian radio personalities